The Deborah Heart and Lung Center is located in Browns Mills, Burlington County, New Jersey, United States.  It is the only hospital in the Delaware Valley region that focuses exclusively on cardiac, vascular, and lung disease.

Deborah Heart and Lung Center has 89 beds with a full-service ambulatory care center. In March 2010, Deborah Heart and Lung Center opened an emergency department operated by Lourdes Medical Center of Burlington County. The emergency department offers ambulances and walk-in patients access to emergency care.

History 
Dora Moness Shapiro established Deborah in 1922 as a tuberculosis sanitorium to provide care for those who could not afford it. Her motto was "There is no price tag on life!" Legend has it that Deborah's rural Burlington County location was the key to recovery because of its therapeutic Jersey Pine Barrens air. In reality, thousands of tuberculosis patients were medically treated and successfully cured by Deborah physicians.

In 1934, a woman named Clara Franks became a tuberculosis patient at Deborah. She was cured the next year. Following her discharge, she began to work for Deborah as a secretary and fundraising assistant. She began organizing community-based chapters to support Deborah, laying the foundation for the Deborah Hospital Foundation of today.

In the late 1940s, with the development of antibiotics that could arrest tuberculosis, Deborah began to shift emphasis to treating heart diseases. On July 28, 1958, pioneering heart surgeon Dr. Charles Bailey performed Deborah's first on-site heart surgery on three-year-old Bill DiMartino, followed by Dora Hansen, age 36.

In 1959, Deborah made an official name change to Deborah Hospital. In 1973, Deborah Hospital made another official name change to Deborah Heart and Lung Center, which still remains today.

Deborah Hospital Foundation 
Founded in 1974, Deborah Hospital Foundation is the fund raising arm of Deborah Heart and Lung Center.

Services offered 
 Clinical Interventional Cardiology
 Outpatient Pediatric Cardiology
 Electromechanical Therapy Institute
 Pulmonary Medicine
 Institute for Sleep Medicine
 Balance Center
 Vascular and Endovascular Medicine
 Vein Center
 Thoracic and Cardiothoracic Surgery

References

Buildings and structures in Burlington County, New Jersey
Hospitals in New Jersey
Hospitals established in 1922
Tuberculosis sanatoria in the United States
Pemberton Township, New Jersey